This was the first edition of the tournament.

Gilles Müller won the title, defeating Lukáš Lacko in the final, 7-6(7–4), 6–3.

Seeds

Draw

Finals

Top half

Bottom half

External links
 Main Draw
 Qualifying Draw

2014 ATP Challenger Tour
2014 Singles